Hand-Made Devices is an album by The Future Sound of London under the alias Polemical; it is the first album under the pseudonym. The nature of the music is very experimental and is created almost entirely using Brian Dougans' electronic creations, including glitch devices and the like. There are videos on Dougans own YouTube channel ("STAKKERHUMANOID") demonstrating the devices he has made. The website FSOLDigital.com says that all the devices used were modified by the band. The album is available only at their digital download site.

Track listing
 Mos Son (4:36)
 Watery Seq (1:37)
 Matti (2:48)
 Honher 1 (0:44)
 Bats (2:47)
 15 Frames A Second (2:15)
 Early Sun (2:14)
 Iseuem (2:19)
 Kontact (2:44)
 2 Boots Together (5:14)
 Truma (1:49)
 Made Formal (1:22)
 Medium Pull (2:50)
 Zee2006 (0:24)
 Sub Equal (2:26)
 At The Beginning (2:14)
 Staggered (2:08)
 7 Song 7 (1:59)
 Sk1 Song (1:13)
 Satallite (3:03)
 Gogs People (1:03)
 Formings (0:29)

Crew
Composed by FSOL
Produced by Brian Dougans

References

External links
 

The Future Sound of London albums
2007 albums